Dendrobium adae, commonly known as the slender cane orchid, is an epiphytic, sometimes lithophytic orchid in the family Orchidaceae. It has cylindrical pseudobulbs, up to four dark green leaves and up to six white or greenish to apricot-coloured flowers. It grows in tropical North Queensland, Australia.

Description 
The petals are lance-shaped, curved inwards and slightly shorter and narrower than the lateral sepals. The side lobes curve upwards and the middle lobe has a ridge along its midline. Flowering occurs between July and October.

Taxonomy and naming
Dendrobium adae was first formally described in 1884 by Frederick Manson Bailey from a specimen collected near Herberton and the description was published in the Proceedings of the Royal Society of Queensland. The specific epithet (adae) is "in honour of Mrs. J. W R. Stuart" who collected the type specimen.

Distribution and habitat
The slender cane orchid grows in rainforest and sheltered open forest between the Mount Windsor National Park and the Paluma Range National Park.

References 

adae
Orchids of Queensland
Epiphytic orchids
Plants described in 1884